Sheyda District is in Ben County, Chaharmahal and Bakhtiari province, Iran. At the 2006 census, its population was 5,018 in 1,247 households (as parts of Zayandeh Rud-e Jonubi Rural District in Ben District of Shahrekord County) and before the formation of Ben County. The following census in 2011 counted 4,837 people in 1,431 households. At the latest census in 2016, the district had 4,702 inhabitants living in 1,471 households, by which time it became one of two districts in the recently formed Ben County.

References 

Ben County

Districts of Chaharmahal and Bakhtiari Province

Populated places in Chaharmahal and Bakhtiari Province

Populated places in Ben County

fa:بخش شیدا